"The Posthumous" is an epithet for:

 Charles of Austria, Bishop of Wroclaw (1590–1624), Prince-Bishop of Wrocław (Breslau), Prince-Bishop of Brixen, Grand Master of the Teutonic Order and ruler of the Bohemian County of Kladsko
 John I of France (born and died in 1316), King of France and Navarre
 Ladislaus the Posthumous (1440–1457), Duke of Austria and King of Hungary, Croatia and Bohemia
 Stephen the Posthumous (1236–1271), son of King Andrew II of Hungary and father of King Andrew III of Hungary
 Theobald I of Navarre (1201–1253), King of Navarre and Count of Champagne

Lists of people by epithet